Fort Denison Light, also known as Pinchgut Light, is an active lighthouse located on top of a Martello Tower at Fort Denison, a former penal site and defensive facility occupying a small island in Sydney Harbour, New South Wales, Australia. The island is located downstream from the Harbour Bridge near Potts Point and the Royal Botanic Gardens. The fort is also known as "Pinchgut" lending its name to the light.

History 
The lantern and light, built in Birmingham, England, were added on top of the Martello Tower in 1913, replacing an  gun. The original light source was an acetylene gas carbide lamp, and it was converted to electricity by 1926. The station also includes a tide gauge, established in the mid-19th century, navigation channel markers, and a fog bell.

Renovation 
On 30 October 2003, the entire lightroom structure was removed for renovation. As the National Parks and Wildlife Service curator Stephen Thompson said an airlift was the safest way, the lantern was transported to shore by a helicopter in a sling. Renovation took place at a workshop in the nearby St Peters. The entire operation was coordinated by National Parks, the Sydney Ports corporation and Australian Defence Industries.

For the renovation the structure was disassembled, paint was removed and new steel patches were welded onto corroded areas. A replica base ring was fabricated and hot riveted into place. The surface was then painted and treated against corrosion.

On 20 May 2004, the lantern was returned by helicopter and reinstalled.

Site operation 
The light is managed by the Sydney Ports corporation. The site is managed by the National Parks and Wildlife Service in the Department of Environment, Climate Change and Water since 1992, as part of the Sydney Harbour National Park.

Visiting 
The island is accessible by boat. It is open for guided tours for a fee, requiring reservation. The tower is now open to the public.

See also 

 List of lighthouses in Australia

References and notes

External links 
 
 

Lighthouses completed in 1913
Lighthouses in Sydney
1913 establishments in Australia
Sydney Harbour National Park